Allogaster drumonti is a species of cerambycid from the Achrysonini tribe. They are mainly found in the Democratic Republic of the Congo.

References 

Achrysonini
Endemic fauna of the Democratic Republic of the Congo